Chromate salts contain the chromate anion, . Dichromate salts contain the dichromate anion, . They are oxyanions of chromium in the +6 oxidation state and are moderately strong oxidizing agents. In an aqueous solution, chromate and dichromate ions can be interconvertible.

Chemical properties 

Chromates react with hydrogen peroxide, giving products in which peroxide, replaces one or more oxygen atoms. In acid solution the unstable blue peroxo complex Chromium(VI) oxide peroxide, CrO(O2)2, is formed; it is an uncharged covalent molecule, which may be extracted into ether. Addition of pyridine results in the formation of the more stable complex CrO(O2)2py.

Acid–base properties 

In aqueous solution, chromate and dichromate anions exist in a chemical equilibrium.
2  + 2 H+   + H2O
The predominance diagram shows that the position of the equilibrium depends on both pH and the analytical concentration of chromium. The chromate ion is the predominant species in alkaline solutions, but dichromate can become the predominant ion in acidic solutions.

Further condensation reactions can occur in strongly acidic solution with the formation of trichromates, and tetrachromates, . All polyoxyanions of chromium(VI) have structures made up of tetrahedral CrO4 units sharing corners.

The hydrogen chromate ion, HCrO4−, is a weak acid:
   + H+; pKa ≈ 5.9
It is also in equilibrium with the dichromate ion:
2    + H2O
This equilibrium does not involve a change in hydrogen ion concentration, which would predict that the equilibrium is independent of pH. The red line on the predominance diagram is not quite horizontal due to the simultaneous equilibrium with the chromate ion. The hydrogen chromate ion may be protonated, with the formation of molecular chromic acid, H2CrO4, but the pKa for the equilibrium 
H2CrO4   + H+
is not well characterized. Reported values vary between about −0.8 and 1.6.

The dichromate ion is a somewhat weaker base than the chromate ion:
   + H+, pK = 1.18
The pK value for this reaction shows that it can be ignored at pH > 4.

Oxidation–reduction properties 
The chromate and dichromate ions are fairly strong oxidizing agents. Commonly three electrons are added to a chromium atom, reducing it to oxidation state +3. In acid solution the aquated Cr3+ ion is produced.
 + 14 H+ + 6 e− → 2 Cr3+ + 7 H2O ε0 = 1.33 V
In alkaline solution chromium(III) hydroxide is produced. The redox potential shows that chromates are weaker oxidizing agent in alkaline solution than in acid solution. 
 + 4  + 3 e− →  + 5  ε0 = −0.13 V

Applications

Approximately  of hexavalent chromium, mainly sodium dichromate, were produced in 1985. Chromates and dichromates are used in chrome plating to protect metals from corrosion and to improve paint adhesion. Chromate and dichromate salts of heavy metals, lanthanides and alkaline earth metals are only very slightly soluble in water and are thus used as pigments. The lead-containing pigment chrome yellow was used for a very long time before environmental regulations discouraged its use. When used as oxidizing agents or titrants in a redox chemical reaction, chromates and dichromates convert into trivalent chromium, Cr3+, salts of which typically have a distinctively different blue-green color.

Natural occurrence and production

The primary chromium ore is the mixed metal oxide chromite, FeCr2O4, found as brittle metallic black crystals or granules. Chromite ore is heated with a mixture of calcium carbonate and sodium carbonate in the presence of air. The chromium is oxidized to the hexavalent form, while the iron forms iron(III) oxide, Fe2O3:
4 FeCr2O4 + 8 Na2CO3 + 7 O2 → 8 Na2CrO4 + 2 Fe2O3 + 8 CO2
Subsequent leaching of this material at higher temperatures dissolves the chromates, leaving a residue of insoluble iron oxide. Normally the chromate solution is further processed to make chromium metal, but a chromate salt may be obtained directly from the liquor.

Chromate containing minerals are rare. Crocoite, PbCrO4, which can occur as spectacular long red crystals, is the most commonly found chromate mineral. Rare potassium chromate minerals and related compounds are found in the Atacama desert. Among them is lópezite – the only known dichromate mineral.

Toxicity

All hexavalent chromium compounds are toxic (due to their oxidizing power) and carcinogenic (IARC Group 1), especially if airborne and inhaled where they cause lung cancer. Also positive associations have been observed between exposure to chromium (VI) compounds and cancer of the nose and nasal sinuses. The use of chromate compounds in manufactured goods is restricted in the EU (and by market commonality the rest of the world) by EU Parliament directive on the Restriction of Hazardous Substances (RoHS) Directive (2002/95/EC).

See also 
Chromate conversion coating

Notes

References

External links 
National Pollutant Inventory - Chromium(VI) and compounds fact sheet
Demonstration of chromate-dichromate equilibrium

 
Oxidizing agents
Transition metal oxyanions
Oxometallates